Cyperus refractus is a species of sedge that is native to south eastern parts of North America.

See also 
 List of Cyperus species

References 

refractus
Plants described in 1870
Flora of Texas
Flora of Alabama
Flora of Arkansas
Flora of Georgia (U.S. state)
Flora of Kentucky
Flora of Maryland
Flora of Missouri
Flora of North Carolina
Flora of South Carolina
Flora of Pennsylvania
Flora of Tennessee
Flora of Virginia
Taxa named by Johann Otto Boeckeler
Flora without expected TNC conservation status